Edmond Seward (26 September 1906 – 12 February 1954) was a Hollywood screenwriter who had originally attended Northwestern University and worked as a journalist, before doing some writing for Disney.

During the mid-1930s he was brought out to Australia by director Ken G. Hall, to write movies and train Australian screenwriters for Cinesound Productions.

"We hired him at one hundred pounds a week as a writer and he laughed at it, but he said he would like a trip to the South Seas, and he came for one hundred pounds a week and brought his wife", said Hall. "He didn't know all that much as it turned out."

Seward ended up writing two films for Cinesound, Thoroughbred (1936) and Orphan of the Wilderness (1936), as well as adapting Thoroughbred into a novel. He soon returned to Hollywood, with Hall claiming the writer "had not been a bell-ringing success". Hall thought Seward may have been responsible  for plagiarising the end of Thoroughbred from the Frank Capra film, Broadway Bill (1934).

Seward later worked for Screen Gems and wrote a number of scripts for The Bowery Boys.

Selected filmography
Walls of Gold (1933)
Fashions of 1934 (1934) (uncredited)
Thoroughbred (1936)
Orphan of the Wilderness (1936)
The Devil Is Driving (1937) – uncredited
The Duke Comes Back (1937)
Gulliver's Travels (1939)
There's Something About a Soldier (1943) – short
The Disillusioned Bluebird (1944) – short
Mutt 'n' Bones (1944) – short
As the Fly Flies (1944) – short
In Fast Company (1946)
Bowery Bombshell (1946)
Spook Busters (1946)
Hard Boiled Mahoney (1946)
News Hounds (1947)
Bowery Buckaroos (1947)
Angels' Alley (1948)
Jinx Money (1948)
Smugglers' Cove (1948)
Trouble Makers (1948)
Fighting Fools (1949)
Bela Lugosi Meets a Brooklyn Gorilla (1952) – additional dialogue

References

External links

American male screenwriters
1906 births
1954 deaths
People from Xenia, Ohio
Screenwriters from Ohio
Fleischer Studios people
20th-century American male writers
20th-century American screenwriters
American expatriates in Australia